The Big Four Conference  was an intercollegiate athletic college football conference that existed in Wisconsin from 1923 and 1932. Its membership was centered on the state of Wisconsin.

Champions

1923 – Unknown
1924 – Unknown
1925 – Carroll (WI)
1926 – Carroll (WI)

1927 – Carroll (WI)
1928 – Carroll (WI)
1929 – Ripon (WI)

1930 – Carroll (WI)
1931 – Ripon (WI)
1932 – Ripon (WI)

See also
 List of defunct college football conferences

References